Alcohol, sometimes referred to by the chemical name ethanol, is a depressant drug that is the active ingredient in drinks such as beer, wine, and distilled spirits (hard liquor). It is one of the oldest and most commonly consumed recreational drugs, causing the characteristic effects of alcohol intoxication ("drunkenness"). Among other effects, alcohol produces happiness and euphoria, decreased anxiety, increased sociability, sedation, impairment of cognitive, memory, motor, and sensory function, and generalized depression of central nervous system (CNS) function. Ethanol is only one of several types of alcohol, but it is the only type of alcohol that is found in alcoholic beverages or commonly used for recreational purposes; other alcohols such as methanol and isopropyl alcohol are significantly more toxic.  A mild, brief exposure to isopropanol, being only moderately more toxic than ethanol, is unlikely to cause any serious harm. Methanol, being profoundly more toxic than ethanol, is lethal in quantities as small as 10–15 milliliters (2–3 teaspoons).

Alcohol has a variety of short-term and long-term adverse effects. Short-term adverse effects include generalized impairment of neurocognitive function, dizziness, nausea, vomiting, and hangover-like symptoms. Alcohol is addictive to humans, and can result in alcohol use disorder, dependence and withdrawal. It can have a variety of long-term adverse effects on health, such as liver and brain damage, and its consumption can cause cancer. The adverse effects of alcohol on health are most important when it is used in excessive quantities or with heavy frequency. However, some of them, such as increased risk of certain cancers, may occur even with light or moderate alcohol consumption. In high amounts, alcohol may cause loss of consciousness or, in severe cases, death.

Alcohol works in the brain primarily by increasing the effects of γ-Aminobutyric acid (GABA), the major inhibitory neurotransmitter in the brain; by facilitating GABA's actions, alcohol suppresses the activity of the CNS. The substance also directly affects a number of other neurotransmitter systems including those of glutamate, glycine, acetylcholine, and serotonin. The pleasurable effects of alcohol ingestion are the result of increased levels of dopamine and endogenous opioids in the reward pathways of the brain. Alcohol also has toxic and unpleasant actions in the body, many of which are mediated by its byproduct acetaldehyde.

Alcohol has been produced and consumed by humans for its psychoactive effects for almost 10,000 years. Drinking alcohol is generally socially acceptable and is legal in most countries, unlike with many other recreational substances. However, there are often restrictions on alcohol sale and use, for instance a minimum age for drinking and laws against public drinking and drinking and driving. Alcohol has considerable societal and cultural significance and has important social roles in much of the world. Drinking establishments, such as bars and nightclubs, revolve primarily around the sale and consumption of alcoholic beverages, and parties, festivals, and social gatherings commonly involve alcohol consumption. Alcohol is unique in that it is the only drug that damages others more than the user. It is related to various societal problems, including drunk driving, accidental injuries, sexual assaults, domestic abuse, and violent crime. Alcohol remains illegal for sale and consumption in a number of countries, mainly in the Middle East. While some religions, including Islam, prohibit alcohol consumption, other religions, such as Christianity and Shinto, utilize alcohol in sacrament and libation.

Use and effects

Ethanol is typically consumed as a recreational substance by mouth in the form of alcoholic beverages such as beer, wine, and spirits. It is commonly used in social settings due to its capacity to enhance sociability.

The amount of ethanol in the body is typically quantified by blood alcohol content (BAC); weight of ethanol per unit volume of blood. Small doses of ethanol, in general, are stimulant-like and produce euphoria and relaxation; people experiencing these symptoms tend to become talkative and less inhibited, and may exhibit poor judgement. At higher dosages (BAC > 1 gram/liter), ethanol acts as a central nervous system (CNS) depressant, producing at progressively higher dosages, impaired sensory and motor function, slowed cognition, stupefaction, unconsciousness, and possible death. Ethanol is commonly consumed as a recreational substance, especially while socializing, due to its psychoactive effects.

Standard drink
There is no single standard, but a standard drink of 10 g alcohol (12.7 millilitres), which is used in the World Health Organization (WHO) Alcohol Use Disorders Identification Test (AUDIT)'s questionnaire form example, have been adopted by more countries than any other amount.

Toxicity

Alcohol has a variety of short-term and long-term adverse effects. It also has reinforcement-related adverse effects, including addiction, dependence, and withdrawal.

Social harm

Alcohol causes a plethora of detrimental effects in society. It is highly associated with drinking in public, passive drinking, drunk dialing, drunk driving, sexual risk-taking or drug facilitated sexual assault (especially with caffeinated alcoholic drinks), and both violent and non-violent crime. About one-third of arrests in the United States involve alcohol misuse. Many emergency room visits also involve alcohol use. As many as 15% of employees show problematic alcohol-related behaviors in the workplace, such as drinking before going to work or even drinking on the job. Heavy drinking is associated with vulnerability to injury, marital discord, and domestic violence. Alcohol use is directly related to considerable morbidity and mortality, for instance due to overdose and alcohol-related health problems.

Alcohol-related crimes

Automobile accidents

A 2002 study found 41% of people fatally injured in traffic accidents were in alcohol-related crashes. Misuse of alcohol is associated with more than 40% of deaths that occur in automobile accidents every year. The risk of a fatal car accident increases exponentially with the level of alcohol in the driver's blood. Most drunk driving laws in the U.S. governing the acceptable levels in the blood while driving or operating heavy machinery set typical upper limits of legal BAC at 0.08%.

Sexual assault

Alcohol is often used to facilitate sexual assault or rape. Over 50% of reported rapes involve alcohol. It is the most commonly used date rape drug.

Violent crime

Over 40% of all assaults and 40 to 50% of all murders involve alcohol. More than 43% of violent encounters with police involve alcohol. Alcohol is implicated in more than two-thirds of cases of intimate partner violence. In 2002, it was estimated that 1 million violent crimes in the U.S. were related to alcohol use. Alcohol is more commonly associated with both violent and non-violent crime than are drugs like marijuana.

Health consequences

Alcohol use disorder is a major problem and many health problems as well as death can result from excessive alcohol use. Alcohol dependence is linked to a lifespan that is reduced by about 12 years relative to the average person. In 2004, it was estimated that 4% of deaths worldwide were attributable to alcohol use. Deaths from alcohol are split about evenly between acute causes (e.g., overdose, accidents) and chronic conditions. The leading chronic alcohol-related condition associated with death is alcoholic liver disease. Alcohol dependence is also associated with cognitive impairment and organic brain damage. Some researchers have found that even one alcoholic drink a day increases an individual's risk of health problems by 0.4%.

Adverse effects

Short-term effects

Central nervous system impairment 
Alcohol causes generalized CNS depression, is a positive allosteric GABAA modulator and is associated and related with cognitive, memory, motor, and sensory impairment. It slows and impairs cognition and reaction time and the cognitive skills, impairs judgement, interferes with motor function resulting in motor incoordination, loss of balance, confusion, sedation, numbness and slurred speech, impairs memory formation, and causes sensory impairment. At high concentrations, it can induce amnesia, analgesia, spins, stupor, and unconsciousness as result of high levels of ethanol in blood.

At very high concentrations, alcohol can cause anterograde amnesia, markedly decreased heart rate, pulmonary aspiration, positional alcohol nystagmus, respiratory depression, shock, coma and death can result due to profound suppression of CNS function alcohol overdose and can finish in consequent dysautonomia.

Gastrointestinal effects 

Alcohol can cause nausea and vomiting in sufficiently high amounts (varying by person).

Alcohol stimulates gastric juice production, even when food is not present, and as a result, its consumption stimulates acidic secretions normally intended to digest protein molecules. Consequently, the excess acidity may harm the inner lining of the stomach. The stomach lining is normally protected by a mucosal layer that prevents the stomach from, essentially, digesting itself. However, in patients who have a peptic ulcer disease (PUD), this mucosal layer is broken down. PUD is commonly associated with the bacteria Helicobacter pylori, which secretes a toxin that weakens the mucosal wall, allowing acid and protein enzymes to penetrate the weakened barrier. Because alcohol stimulates the stomach to secrete acid, a person with PUD should avoid drinking alcohol on an empty stomach. Drinking alcohol causes more acid release, which further damages the already-weakened stomach wall. Complications of this disease could include a burning pain in the abdomen, bloating and in severe cases, the presence of dark black stools indicate internal bleeding. A person who drinks alcohol regularly is strongly advised to reduce their intake to prevent PUD aggravation.

Ingestion of alcohol can initiate systemic pro-inflammatory changes through two intestinal routes: (1) altering intestinal microbiota composition (dysbiosis), which increases lipopolysaccharide (LPS) release, and (2) degrading intestinal mucosal barrier integrity – thus allowing LPS to enter the circulatory system. The major portion of the blood supply to the liver is provided by the portal vein. Therefore, while the liver is continuously fed nutrients from the intestine, it is also exposed to any bacteria and/or bacterial derivatives that breach the intestinal mucosal barrier. Consequently, LPS levels increase in the portal vein, liver and systemic circulation after alcohol intake. Immune cells in the liver respond to LPS with the production of reactive oxygen species, leukotrienes, chemokines and cytokines. These factors promote tissue inflammation and contribute to organ pathology.

Allergic-like reactions 

Ethanol-containing beverages can cause alcohol flush reactions, exacerbations of rhinitis and, more seriously and commonly, bronchoconstriction in patients with a history of asthma, and in some cases, urticarial skin eruptions, and systemic dermatitis.  Such reactions can occur within 1–60 minutes of ethanol ingestion, and may be caused by:
 genetic abnormalities in the metabolism of ethanol, which can cause the ethanol metabolite, acetaldehyde, to accumulate in tissues and trigger the release of histamine, or
 true allergy reactions to allergens occurring naturally in, or contaminating, alcoholic beverages (particularly wine and beer), and
 other unknown causes.

Long-term effects 

Prolonged heavy consumption of alcohol can cause significant permanent damage to the brain and other organs, resulting in dysfunction or death.

Brain damage 

Alcohol can cause brain damage, Wernicke's encephalopathy and Alcoholic Korsakoff syndrome which frequently occur simultaneously, known as Wernicke–Korsakoff syndrome. Lesions, or brain abnormalities, are typically located in the diencephalon which result in anterograde and retrograde amnesia, or memory loss.

Liver damage 

During the metabolism of alcohol via the respective dehydrogenases, nicotinamide adenine dinucleotide (NAD) is converted into reduced NAD. Normally, NAD is used to metabolize fats in the liver, and as such alcohol competes with these fats for the use of NAD. Prolonged exposure to alcohol means that fats accumulate in the liver, leading to the term 'fatty liver'. Continued consumption (such as in alcohol use disorder) then leads to cell death in the hepatocytes as the fat stores reduce the function of the cell to the point of death. These cells are then replaced with scar tissue, leading to the condition called cirrhosis.

Birth defects 

Ethanol is classified as a teratogen. According to the U.S. Centers for Disease Control and Prevention (CDC), alcohol consumption by women who are not using birth control increases the risk of fetal alcohol syndrome. The CDC currently recommends complete abstinence from alcoholic beverages for women of child-bearing age who are pregnant, trying to become pregnant, or are sexually active and not using birth control.

Cancer 
The International Agency for Research on Cancer lists ethanol in alcoholic beverages as a Group 1 carcinogen in humans and argues that "There is sufficient evidence and research showing the carcinogenicity of acetaldehyde (the major metabolite of ethanol) which is excreted by the liver enzyme when one drinks alcohol."

 Other effects 
Frequent drinking of alcoholic beverages is a major contributing factor in cases of elevated blood levels of triglycerides.

 Reinforcement disorders 

 Addiction, dependence and withdrawal 

Alcohol addiction is termed alcohol use disorder. Two or more consecutive alcohol-free days a week have been recommended to improve health and break dependence.

Discontinuation of alcohol after extended heavy use and associated tolerance development (resulting in dependence) can result in withdrawal. Alcohol withdrawal can cause confusion, paranoia, anxiety, insomnia, agitation, tremors, fever, nausea, vomiting, autonomic dysfunction, seizures, and hallucinations. In severe cases, death can result. Delirium tremens is a condition that requires people with a long history of heavy drinking to undertake an alcohol detoxification regimen.

 Overdose 

Death from ethanol consumption is possible when blood alcohol levels reach 0.4%. A blood level of 0.5% or more is commonly fatal. Levels of even less than 0.1% can cause intoxication, with unconsciousness often occurring at 0.3–0.4%.

The oral median lethal dose (LD50) of ethanol in rats is 5,628 mg/kg. Directly translated to human beings, this would mean that if a person who weighs  drank a  glass of pure ethanol, they would theoretically have a 50% risk of dying. Symptoms of ethanol overdose may include nausea, vomiting, CNS depression, coma, acute respiratory failure, or death.

 Interactions 

Alcohol can intensify the sedation caused by other CNS depressants such as barbiturates, benzodiazepines, opioids, nonbenzodiazepines/Z-drugs (such as zolpidem and zopiclone), antipsychotics, sedative antihistamines, and certain antidepressants. It interacts with cocaine in vivo to produce cocaethylene, another psychoactive substance. Ethanol enhances the bioavailability of methylphenidate (elevated plasma dexmethylphenidate). In combination with cannabis, ethanol increases plasma tetrahydrocannabinol levels, which suggests that ethanol may increase the absorption of tetrahydrocannabinol.

 Disulfiram-like drugs 

 Disulfiram 
Disulfiram inhibits the enzyme acetaldehyde dehydrogenase, which in turn results in buildup of acetaldehyde, a toxic metabolite of ethanol with unpleasant effects. The medication or drug is commonly used to treat alcohol use disorder, and results in immediate hangover-like symptoms upon consumption of alcohol, this effect is widely known as disulfiram effect.

 Metronidazole 
One of the most important drug/food interactions is between alcohol and metronidazole.

Metronidazole is an antibacterial agent that kills bacteria by damaging cellular DNA and hence cellular function. Metronidazole is usually given to people who have diarrhea caused by Clostridium difficile bacteria. C. difficile is one of the most common microorganisms that cause diarrhea and can lead to colon inflammation and more severely, death.

Patients who are taking metronidazole are sometimes advised to avoid alcohol, even after 1 hour following the last dose. Although older data suggested a possible disulfiram-like effect of metronidazole, newer data has challenged this and suggests it does not actually have this effect.

 Methanol and ethylene glycol 

The rate-limiting steps for the elimination of ethanol are in common with certain other substances. As a result, the blood alcohol concentration can be used to modify the rate of metabolism of methanol and ethylene glycol. Methanol itself is not highly toxic, but its metabolites formaldehyde and formic acid are; therefore, to reduce the rate of production and concentration of these harmful metabolites, ethanol can be ingested. Ethylene glycol poisoning can be treated in the same way.

 Pharmacology 
 Dynamics 

The precise mechanism of action of ethanol has proven elusive and remains not fully understood. Identifying molecular targets for ethanol has proven unusually difficult, in large part due to its unique biochemical properties. Specifically, ethanol is a very low molecular weight compound and is of exceptionally low potency in its actions, causing effects only at very high (millimolar (mM)) concentrations. For these reasons, unlike with most drugs, it has not yet been possible to employ traditional biochemical techniques to directly assess the binding of ethanol to receptors or ion channels. Instead, researchers have had to rely on functional studies to elucidate the actions of ethanol. Moreover, although it has been established that ethanol modulates ion channels to mediate its effects, ion channels are complex proteins, and their interactions and functions are complicated by diverse subunit compositions and regulation by conserved cellular signals (e.g. signaling lipids).

Much progress has been made in understanding the pharmacodynamics of ethanol over the last few decades. While no binding sites have been identified and established unambiguously for ethanol at present, it appears that it affects ion channels, in particular ligand-gated ion channels, to mediate its effects in the CNS. Ethanol has specifically been found in functional assays to enhance or inhibit the activity of a variety of ion channels, including the GABAA receptor, the ionotropic glutamate AMPA, kainate, and NMDA receptors, the glycine receptor, the nicotinic acetylcholine receptors, the serotonin 5-HT3 receptor, voltage-gated calcium channels, and BK channels, among others. However, many of these actions have been found to occur only at very high concentrations that may not be pharmacologically significant at recreational doses of ethanol, and it is unclear how or to what extent each of the individual actions is involved in the effects of ethanol. In any case, ethanol has long shown a similarity in its effects to positive allosteric modulators of the GABAA receptor like benzodiazepines, barbiturates, and various general anesthetics. Indeed, ethanol has been found to enhance GABAA receptor-mediated currents in functional assays. In accordance, it is theorized and widely believed that the primary mechanism of action is as a GABAA receptor positive allosteric modulator. However, the diverse actions of ethanol on other ion channels may be and indeed likely are involved in its effects as well.

In 2007, it was discovered that ethanol potentiates extrasynaptic δ subunit-containing GABAA receptors at behaviorally relevant (as low as 3 mM) concentrations. This is in contrast to previous functional assays of ethanol on γ subunit-containing GABAA receptors, which it enhances only at far higher concentrations (> 100 mM) that are in excess of recreational concentrations (up to 50 mM). Ro15-4513, a close analogue of the benzodiazepine antagonist flumazenil (Ro15-1788), has been found to bind to the same site as ethanol and to competitively displace it in a saturable manner. In addition, Ro15-4513 blocked the enhancement of δ subunit-containing GABAA receptor currents by ethanol in vitro. In accordance, the drug has been found to reverse many of the behavioral effects of low-to-moderate doses of ethanol in rodents, including its effects on anxiety, memory, motor behavior, and self-administration. Taken together, these findings suggest a binding site for ethanol on subpopulations of the GABAA receptor with specific subunit compositions via which it interacts with and potentiates the receptor.

A 2019 study showed the accumulation of an unnatural lipid phosphatidylethanol (PEth) competes with PIP2 agonist sites on lipid-gated ion channels. This presents a novel indirect mechanism and suggests that a metabolite, not the ethanol itself, can affect the primary targets of ethanol intoxication. Many of the primary targets of ethanol are known to bind PIP2 including GABAA receptors, but the role of PEth will need to be investigated for each of the primary targets.

 Rewarding and reinforcing actions 
The reinforcing effects of alcohol consumption are mediated by acetaldehyde generated by catalase and other oxidizing enzymes such as cytochrome P-4502E1 in the brain. Although acetaldehyde has been associated with some of the adverse and toxic effects of ethanol, it appears to play a central role in the activation of the mesolimbic dopamine system.

Ethanol's rewarding and reinforcing (i.e., addictive) properties are mediated through its effects on dopamine neurons in the mesolimbic reward pathway, which connects the ventral tegmental area to the nucleus accumbens (NAcc). One of ethanol's primary effects is the allosteric inhibition of NMDA receptors and facilitation of GABAA receptors (e.g., enhanced GABAA receptor-mediated chloride flux through allosteric regulation of the receptor). At high doses, ethanol inhibits most ligand-gated ion channels and voltage-gated ion channels in neurons as well.

With acute alcohol consumption, dopamine is released in the synapses of the mesolimbic pathway, in turn heightening activation of postsynaptic D1 receptors. The activation of these receptors triggers postsynaptic internal signaling events through protein kinase A, which ultimately phosphorylate cAMP response element binding protein (CREB), inducing CREB-mediated changes in gene expression.

With chronic alcohol intake, consumption of ethanol similarly induces CREB phosphorylation through the D1 receptor pathway, but it also alters NMDA receptor function through phosphorylation mechanisms; an adaptive downregulation of the D1 receptor pathway and CREB function occurs as well. Chronic consumption is also associated with an effect on CREB phosphorylation and function via postsynaptic NMDA receptor signaling cascades through a MAPK/ERK pathway and CAMK-mediated pathway.

 Relationship between concentrations and effects 

Recreational concentrations of ethanol are typically in the range of 1 to 50 mM. Very low concentrations of 1 to 2 mM ethanol produce zero or undetectable effects except in alcohol-naive individuals. Slightly higher levels of 5 to 10 mM, which are associated with light social drinking, produce measurable effects including changes in visual acuity, decreased anxiety, and modest behavioral disinhibition. Further higher levels of 15 to 20 mM result in a degree of sedation and motor incoordination that is contraindicated with the operation of motor vehicles. In jurisdictions in the U.S., maximum blood alcohol levels for legal driving are about 17 to 22 mM. In the upper range of recreational ethanol concentrations of 20 to 50 mM, depression of the central nervous system is more marked, with effects including complete drunkenness, profound sedation, amnesia, emesis, hypnosis, and eventually unconsciousness. Levels of ethanol above 50 mM are not typically experienced by normal individuals and hence are not usually physiologically relevant; however, such levels – ranging from 50 to 100 mM – may be experienced by alcoholics with high tolerance to ethanol. Concentrations above this range, specifically in the range of 100 to 200 mM, would cause death in all people except alcoholics.

 List of known actions in the central nervous system 
Ethanol has been reported to possess the following actions in functional assays at varying concentrations:

 GABAA receptor positive allosteric modulator (primarily of δ subunit-containing receptors)
 NMDA receptor negative allosteric modulator
 Decreased levels of nitric oxide in brain medulla
 Increased levels of dopamine and endogenous opioids in the mesolimbic pathway, secondary to other actions
 AMPA receptor negative allosteric modulator
 Kainate receptor negative allosteric modulator
 Glycine receptor positive allosteric modulator
 Serotonin receptor positive allosteric modulator
 Opioid receptor endogenous positive allosteric modulator
 Muscarinic acetylcholine receptor positive allosteric modulator.
 Nicotinic acetylcholine receptor positive allosteric modulator
 5-HT3 receptor positive allosteric modulator
 Glycine reuptake inhibitor
 Adenosine reuptake inhibitor
 Dopamine reuptake inhibitor
 L-type calcium channel blocker
 GIRK channel opener

Some of the actions of ethanol on ligand-gated ion channels, specifically the nicotinic acetylcholine receptors and the glycine receptor, are dose-dependent, with potentiation or inhibition occurring dependent on ethanol concentration. This seems to be because the effects of ethanol on these channels are a summation of positive and negative allosteric modulatory actions.

 Kinetics 
 Absorption 
Ethanol can be taken orally, by inhalation, rectally, or by injection (e.g., intravenous), though it is typically ingested simply via oral administration. The oral bioavailability of ethanol is around 80% or more. In fasting volunteers, blood levels of ethanol increase proportionally with the dose of ethanol administered. Blood alcohol concentrations may be estimated by dividing the amount of ethanol ingested by the body weight of the individual and correcting for water dilution.

Onset
Peak circulating levels of ethanol are usually reached within a range of 30 to 90 minutes of ingestion, with an average of 45 to 60 minutes. People who have fasted overnight have been found to reach peak ethanol concentrations more rapidly, at within 30 minutes of ingestion.

The onset varies depends on the type of alcoholic drink:
 Vodka/tonic: 36 ± 10 minutes
 Wine: 54 ± 14 minutes
 Beer: 62 ± 23 minutes

Also, carbonated alcoholic drinks seem to have a shorter onset compare to flat drinks in the same volume. One theory is that carbon dioxide in the bubbles somehow speeds the flow of alcohol into the intestines.

Food in the gastrointestinal system and hence gastric emptying is the most important factor that influences the absorption of orally ingested ethanol. The absorption of ethanol is much more rapid on an empty stomach than with a full one. The delay in ethanol absorption caused by food is similar regardless of whether food is consumed just before, at the same time, or just after ingestion of ethanol. The type of food, whether fat, carbohydrates, or protein, also is of little importance. Not only does food slow the absorption of ethanol, but it also reduces the bioavailability of ethanol, resulting in lower circulating concentrations.

 Distribution 
Upon ingestion, ethanol is rapidly distributed throughout the body. It is distributed most rapidly to tissues with the greatest blood supply. As such, ethanol primarily affects the brain, liver, and kidneys. Other tissues with lower circulation, such as bone, require more time for ethanol to distribute into. Ethanol crosses biological membranes and the blood–brain barrier easily, through a simple process of passive diffusion. It is only weakly or not at all plasma protein bound.

 Metabolism 

Approximately 90% of the metabolism of ethanol occurs in the liver. This occurs predominantly via the enzyme alcohol dehydrogenase, which transforms ethanol into its metabolite acetaldehyde (ethanal). Acetaldehyde is subsequently metabolized by the enzyme aldehyde dehydrogenase into acetate (ethanoate), which in turn is broken down into carbon dioxide and water. Acetate also combines with coenzyme A to form acetyl-CoA, and hence may participate in metabolic pathways. Alcohol dehydrogenase and aldehyde dehydrogenase are present at their highest concentrations in the liver, but are widely expressed throughout the body, and alcohol dehydrogenase may also be present in the stomach and small intestine. Aside from alcohol dehydrogenase, the microsomal ethanol-oxidizing system (MEOS), specifically mediated by the cytochrome P450 enzyme CYP2E1, is the other major route of ethanol metabolism. CYP2E1 is inducible by ethanol, so while alcohol dehydrogenase handles acute or low concentrations of ethanol, MEOS is predominant with higher concentrations or with repeated/chronic use. A small amount of ethanol undergoes conjugation to form ethyl glucuronide and ethyl sulfate. There may also be another metabolic pathway that metabolizes as much as 25 to 35% of ethanol at typical concentrations.

At even low physiological concentrations, ethanol completely saturates alcohol dehydrogenase. This is because ethanol has high affinity for the enzyme and very high concentrations of ethanol occur when it is used as a recreational substance. For this reason, the metabolism of ethanol follows zero-order kinetics at typical physiological concentrations. That is, ethanol does not have an elimination half-life (i.e., is not metabolized at an exponential rate), and instead, is eliminated from the circulation at a constant rate. The mean elimination rates for ethanol are 15 mg/dL per hour for men and 18 mg/dL per hour for women, with a range of 10 to 34 mg/dL per hour. At very high concentrations, such as in overdose, it has been found that the rate of elimination of ethanol is increased. In addition, ethanol metabolism follows first-order kinetics at very high concentrations, with an elimination half-life of about 4 or 4.5 hours (which implies a clearance rate of approximately 6 L/hour/70 kg). This seems to be because other processes, such as the MEOS/CYP2E1, also become involved in the metabolism of ethanol at higher concentrations. However, the MEOS/CYP2E1 alone does not appear sufficient to fully explain the increase in ethanol metabolism rate.

Some individuals have less effective forms of one or both of the metabolizing enzymes of ethanol, and can experience more marked symptoms from ethanol consumption than others. However, those having acquired alcohol tolerance have a greater quantity of these enzymes, and metabolize ethanol more rapidly.

 Elimination 
Ethanol is mainly eliminated from the body via metabolism into carbon dioxide and water. Around 5 to 10% of ethanol that is ingested is eliminated unchanged in urine, breath, and sweat. Transdermal alcohol that diffuses through the skin as insensible perspiration or is exuded as sweat (sensible perspiration) can be detected using wearable sensor technology such as SCRAM ankle bracelet or the more discreet ION Wearable. Ethanol or its metabolites may be detectable in urine for up to 96 hours (3–5 days) after ingestion.

 Chemistry 

Ethanol is also known chemically as alcohol, ethyl alcohol, or drinking alcohol. It is a simple alcohol with a molecular formula of C2H6O and a molecular weight of 46.0684 g/mol. The molecular formula of ethanol may also be written as CH3−CH2−OH or as C2H5−OH. The latter can also be thought of as an ethyl group linked to a hydroxyl (alcohol) group and can be abbreviated as EtOH. Ethanol is a volatile, flammable, colorless liquid with a slight characteristic odor. Aside from its use as a psychoactive and recreational substance, ethanol is also commonly used as an antiseptic and disinfectant, a chemical and medicinal solvent, and a fuel.

 Production 
Ethanol is produced naturally as a byproduct of the metabolic processes of yeast and hence is present in any yeast habitat, including even endogenously in humans, but it does not cause raised blood alcohol content as seen in the rare medical condition auto-brewery syndrome (ABS). It is manufactured through hydration of ethylene or by brewing via fermentation of sugars with yeast (most commonly Saccharomyces cerevisiae). The sugars are commonly obtained from sources like steeped cereal grains (e.g., barley), grape juice, and sugarcane products (e.g., molasses, sugarcane juice). Ethanol–water mixture which can be further purified via distillation.

 Analogues 

Ethanol has a variety of analogues, many of which have similar actions and effects. Methanol (methyl alcohol) and isopropyl alcohol (also called rubbing alcohol) are both toxic, and thus unsafe for human consumption. Methanol is the most toxic alcohol; the toxicity of isopropyl alcohol lies between that of ethanol and methanol, and is about twice that of ethanol. In general, higher alcohols are less toxic. n-Butanol is reported to produce similar effects to those of ethanol and relatively low toxicity (one-sixth of that of ethanol in one rat study). However, its vapors can produce eye irritation and inhalation can cause pulmonary edema. Acetone (propanone) is a ketone rather than an alcohol, and is reported to produce similar toxic effects; it can be extremely damaging to the cornea.

The tertiary alcohol tert-amyl alcohol (TAA), also known as 2-methylbutan-2-ol (2M2B), has a history of use as a hypnotic and anesthetic, as do other tertiary alcohols such as methylpentynol, ethchlorvynol, and chloralodol. Unlike primary alcohols like ethanol, these tertiary alcohols cannot be oxidized into aldehyde or carboxylic acid metabolites, which are often toxic, and for this reason, these compounds are safer in comparison. Other relatives of ethanol with similar effects include chloral hydrate, paraldehyde, and many volatile and inhalational anesthetics (e.g., chloroform, diethyl ether, and isoflurane).

 History 

Alcohol was brewed as early as 7,000 to 6,650 BCE in northern China. The earliest evidence of winemaking was dated at 6,000 to 5,800 BCE in Georgia in the South Caucasus. Beer was likely brewed from barley as early as the 6th century BCE (600–500 BCE) in Egypt. Pliny the Elder wrote about the golden age'' of winemaking in Rome, the 2nd century BCE (200–100 BCE), when vineyards were planted.

Society and culture

Legal status 

Alcohol consumption is fully legal and available in most countries of the world. Home made alcoholic beverages with low alcohol content like wine, and beer is also legal in most countries, but distilling moonshine outside a registered distillery remains illegal in most of them.

Some majority-Muslim countries, such as Saudi Arabia, Kuwait, Pakistan, Iran and Libya prohibit the production, sale, and consumption of alcoholic beverages because they are forbidden by Islam. Also, laws banning alcohol consumption are found in  some Indian states as well as some Native American reservations in the U.S.

In addition, there are regulations on alcohol sales and use in many countries throughout the world. For instance, some countries have a minimum legal age to purchase or consume alcoholic beverages.  Also, some countries have bans on public intoxication. Drinking while driving or intoxicated driving is frequently outlawed and it may be illegal to have an open container of alcohol or liquor bottle in an automobile, bus or aircraft.

See also 
 Binge drinking
 Comparison of psychoactive alcohols in alcoholic drinks
 Holiday heart syndrome

References

Further reading 
 The National Institute on Alcohol Abuse and Alcoholism maintains a database of alcohol-related health effects. ETOH Archival Database (1972–2003) Alcohol and Alcohol Problems Science Database.

External links 
 ChEBI – biology related
 Kyoto Encyclopedia of Genes and Genomes signal transduction pathway: KEGG – human alcohol addiction

  
  
  
  
  
  

  
  
  
  
  
  
  
  

5-HT3 agonists
AMPA receptor antagonists
Adenosine reuptake inhibitors
Alcohol dehydrogenase inhibitors
Alcohol
Alcohols
Analgesics
Anxiolytics
Calcium channel blockers
Drinking culture
Drug culture
Drugs acting on the nervous system
Ethanol
Euphoriants
GABAA receptor positive allosteric modulators
General anesthetics
Glycine reuptake inhibitors
Hepatotoxins
Hypnotics
IARC Group 1 carcinogens
Kainate receptor antagonists
NMDA receptor antagonists
Neurotoxins
Nicotinic agonists
Psychoactive drugs
Sedatives
Teratogens